The Japanese Improvised Armored Train was a series of armored trains converted from normal passenger trains during the 1920s. They were used to guard the Japanese controlled railways in Manchuria.

References

Armoured trains of Japan